Philippe Chevallier (born 26 April 1961) was a French professional road bicycle racer. He competed in the team pursuit event at the 1980 Summer Olympics. Currently, Chevallier is working at the UCI.

Major results

1979
 National Junior Track Pursuit Championship
 National Junior Road Race Championship
1983
Tour de France:
Winner stage 9
1987
Berner Rundfahrt

References

External links 

Official Tour de France results for Philippe Chevallier (cyclist)

1961 births
Living people
People from Annemasse
French male cyclists
French Tour de France stage winners
Olympic cyclists of France
Cyclists at the 1980 Summer Olympics
French track cyclists
Sportspeople from Haute-Savoie
Cyclists from Auvergne-Rhône-Alpes